Buddhism reached Kyrgyzstan in Central Asia via the Great Silk Road. Archaeologists have found traces of Buddhist influence along this ancient trade route. The most famous Buddhist sites in Kyrgyzstan are the Krasnaya, Rechka and Novopokrovka mounds, where statues of the Buddha have been found.

Buddhism has two branches in Kyrgyzstan: Nipponzan and Karma Kagyu.

Currently, only one registered Buddhist community exists in Kyrgyzstan. The community, known as "Chamsen" ("Liberation" in the Korean language), was founded in 1996 by ethnic Koreans in Gornaya Maevka Village.

See also 
Religion in Kyrgyzstan

References 

Religion in Kyrgyzstan
Kyrgyzstan